Duncan McFarlan (died September 7, 1816) was a United States Democratic-Republican U.S. Congressman from North Carolina between 1805 and 1807.

Born in Laurel Hill, North Carolina in Scotland County, McFarlan engaged in agricultural pursuits. He served in the North Carolina House of Commons in 1792 and in the North Carolina Senate in 1793, 1795 and 1800. At the 1788 Hillsborough Convention, he voted against the ratification of the US Constitution. He was a convicted rapist.

McFarlan stood for election to Congress in 1802, but was unsuccessful; he ran again in 1804 and served one term, in the 9th United States Congress (March 4, 1805 – March 3, 1807). After his term in Washington, McFarlan returned to North Carolina and engaged in mercantile and agricultural pursuits, serving one further term in the state Senate, from 1807 to 1809. He died at Laurel Hill in 1816 and is buried in Laurel Hill Cemetery.

References

External links

18th-century births
Year of birth unknown
1816 deaths
Members of the North Carolina House of Representatives
North Carolina state senators
Democratic-Republican Party members of the United States House of Representatives from North Carolina
People from Scotland County, North Carolina